Lordshillia is an extinct genus of trilobites in the family Trinucleidae.  The genus lived during the early part of the Arenig stage of the Ordovician Period, a faunal stage which lasted from approximately 478 to 471 million years ago.

References

Trinucleidae
Asaphida genera
Ordovician trilobites
Fossils of Great Britain